The 2017 Akron Zips men's soccer team represented The University of Akron during the 2017 NCAA Division I men's soccer season. The Zips, played in the Mid-American Conference.

The Zips ended their 12-year reign as the MAC regular season champions, as an upstart campaign by Western Michigan saw the Broncos beat the Zips on tiebreaker. In the Mid-American Conference Men's Soccer Tournament, Akron defeated Western Michigan, 3-1, in the championship match to win their sixth straight MAC Tournament championship. The championship ensured the program's 14th-straight berth into the 2017 NCAA Division I Men's Soccer Tournament. In the NCAA Tournament, Akron advanced to their fifth-ever College Cup after posting victories over Seattle U, Wisconsin, and Louisville.

The Zips were guided by fifth-year head coach, Jared Embick.

Background

Roster

Schedule 

|-
!colspan=8 style=""| Exhibition
|-

|-
!colspan=8 style=""| Regular Season
|-

|-
!colspan=8 style=""| MAC Tournament
|-

|-
!colspan=8 style=""| NCAA Tournament
|-

Rankings

National rankings

Regional rankings

Season statistics

MLS Draft 
The following members of 2017 Akron Zips men's soccer team were selected in the 2018 MLS SuperDraft.

References 

Akron Zips men's soccer seasons
Akron Zips
Akron Zips
Akron Zips, soccer
Akron
NCAA Division I Men's Soccer Tournament College Cup seasons